Richard Panneflek is a Sint Maarten politician.  he serves as Minister of Public Health, Social Development and Labour in the second cabinet of Prime Minister Silveria Jacobs.

References 

Living people
Year of birth missing (living people)
Place of birth missing (living people)
Sint Maarten politicians
21st-century politicians